The 154th Infantry Division "Murge" was an infantry division of the Royal Italian Army during World War II. The Murge was formed on 1 December 1942 and named for the Murge region. The Murge was classified as an occupation infantry division, which meant that the division's artillery regiment consisted of two artillery groups instead of the three artillery groups of line infantry divisions and that the divisional mortar battalion was replaced by a divisional machine gun battalion. The division was sent to Herzegovina as an occupation force, where it took part in anti-partisan operations. It took part in the Battle of the Sutjeska and then had to be withdrawn after suffering heavy losses. It was disbanded in September 1943, following the announcement of the Armistice of Cassibile.

History

World War I 
The division's lineage begins with the Brigade "Murge" raised on 26 February 1917 with the 259th and 260th infantry regiments. The brigade fought on the Italian front in World War I and together with its regiments was disbanded after the war in July 1919.

Between 1934 and 1939 23rd Infantry Division "Murge" was active in Bari, which on 24 May 1939 changed its name to 23rd Infantry Division "Ferrara".

World War II 
The 154th Infantry Division Murge was activated in Saluzzo on 1 December 1941 and consisted of the 259th and 260th infantry regiments, and the 154th Artillery Regiment. As a division raised during the war the "Murge" did not have its own regimental depots and therefore its regiments were raised by the depots of the 36th Infantry Division "Forlì": the 259th Infantry Regiment "Murge" was raised in Alba on 1 September 1941 by the 43rd Infantry Regiment "Forlì" and the 260th Infantry Regiment "Murge" was raised in Saluzzo on 15 October 1941 by the 44th Infantry Regiment "Forlì", while the 154th Artillery Regiment "Murge" was raised by the 36th Artillery Regiment "Forlì" in Saluzzo.

After the Axis' invasion of Yugoslavia in April 1941 the division was sent to Herzegovina, where it based its headquarter in Mostar and its units in Jablanica, Konjic, Gacko and Nevesinje. Already during its deployment from 15 April to 31 May the division was engaged by Yugoslav partisans, a struggle that continued unabated for all the division's stay in Herzegovina. In February 1943 during the Battle of the Neretva the partisans' 2nd Proletarian Assault Brigade and 5th Proletarian Assault Brigade overran the Murge's positions in Prozor, Jablanica and Gornja Drežnica, annihilating most of the 259th Infantry Regiment and the I Battalion of the 260th Infantry Regiment. The losses were filled by the transfer of men and equipment from the 311th Infantry Regiment "Casale" of the 56th Infantry Division "Casale", which had joined the Murge in the summer of 1942.

In March 1943 the division was transferred to Lika in Croatia, where combat with partisan formations was intense and fierce. In May 1943 the division was moved to Dubrovnik and Trebinje, where it participated in the Battle of Sutjeska. In late August 1943 the division was ordered to return to Italy. On 8 September 1943 when the Armistice of Cassibile was announced the division was located between Senj and Bakar. The division moved to Rijeka, where it was disbanded on 14 September by invading German forces.

Organization 
  154th Infantry Division "Murge"
 259th Infantry Regiment "Murge"
 Command Company
 3x Fusilier battalions
 Anti-tank Company (47/32 anti-tank guns)
 Mortar Company (81mm Mod. 35 mortars)
 260th Infantry Regiment "Murge"
 Command Company
 3x Fusilier battalions
 Anti-tank Company (47/32 anti-tank guns)
 Mortar Company (81mm Mod. 35 mortars)
 311th Infantry Regiment "Casale" (transferred from the 56th Infantry Division "Casale" in summer 1942)
 Command Company
 3x Fusilier battalions (2x battalions transferred to the depleted 259th Infantry Regiment "Murge" in March 1943, replaced by the dismounted cavalry squadron groups: XXIX "Genova Cavalleria" and XXXI "Lancieri di Aosta")
 Anti-tank Company (47/32 anti-tank guns)
 Mortar Company (81mm Mod. 35 mortars)
 154th Artillery Regiment "Murge"
 Command Unit
 I Group (75/27 field guns)
 II Group (100/22 howitzers)
 1x Anti-aircraft battery (20/65 Mod. 35 anti-aircraft guns)
 Ammunition and Supply Unit
 CLIV Machine Gun Battalion
 CLIV Mixed Engineer Battalion
 154th Engineer Company
 254th Telegraph and Radio Operators Company
 154th Anti-tank Company (47/32 anti-tank guns; transferred to the 3rd Infantry Division "Ravenna" for the deployment in the Soviet Union)
 154th Medical Section
 2x Field hospitals
 1x Surgical unit
 154th Supply Section
 254th Bakers section
 119th Transport Section
 118th Carabinieri Section
 119th Carabinieri Section
 154th Field Post Office

Attached to the division in 1943:
 XXIX CC.NN. Battalion
 LXVI Coastal Artillery Group (152/13 howitzers)

Commanding officers 
The division's commanding officers were:

 Generale di Brigata Paride Negri (1 December 1941 - 28 February 1943)
 Generale di Divisione Bartolomeo Pedrotti (1 March 1943 - 30 April 1943)
 Generale di Divisione Eduardo Quarra Sito (1 May 1943 - 14 September 1943)

CROWCASS 
The names of twelve men attached to the division can be found in the Central Registry of War Criminals and Security Suspects (CROWCASS) set up by the Anglo-American Supreme Headquarters Allied Expeditionary Force in 1945. The names can be found at: Central Registry of War Criminals and Security Suspects from the Kingdom of Italy.

Popular culture 
Alistair MacLean's novel Partisans, set in the Balkan Theater of World War II, mentions the Murge as being a major force in the Axis offensives against the Yugoslav Partisans. The book begins during the preparation for Case White and ends with the protagonists having accomplished a significant espionage mission that would ensure the mauling of the Murge at the hands of the Yugoslav Resistance.

References 

 

Infantry divisions of Italy in World War II
Military units and formations of Italy in Yugoslavia in World War II
Military units and formations established in 1942
Military units and formations disestablished in 1943